Documents on sustainable development in Azerbaijan Republic In Azerbaijan, juridical base of realization of the concept of sustainable development has begun to be formed since the second half of 90s. More than 20 national laws on different aspects of sustainable development were officially adopted, including Laws ‘On Protection Of Plants’ (03.12.1996), ‘On Keeping Human Health’ (25.07.1997), ‘On Fishing’ (27.03.1998), ‘On Protection Of Environment’ (08.06.1999), ‘On Protecting Animal World’ (08.06.1999), ‘On Environmental Security’ (08.06.1999), ‘On Protection Of Atmospheric Air’ (03.03.2001), ‘On Obligatory Ecological Insurance’ (12.03.2002), ‘On Ecological Education and Enlightenment’ (10.12.2002), ‘On Environmentally Safe Agriculture’ (16.06.2008), etc. ‘Plan Of Complex Arrangements on Improvement of Ecological Situation In Azerbaijan Within 2006-2010’ have been implemented.

Measurements related to National Programs on ‘Environmentally Sustainable Socioeconomic Development of Azerbaijan Republic’ and ‘Restoration and Enlargement of Forests in Azerbaijan Republic’ (18.02.2003) are implemented. Programs of ‘Rational Use of Summer and Winter Pastures and Hayfields, and Prevention of Desertification’ (22.05.2004), ‘Poverty Reduction and Sustainable Development of Azerbaijan Republic for 2008-2015’ (15.09.2008) ratified by the president of the country, are also being carried out. Great detail on ecological and geographical data has been present within recent surveys of the Azerbaijani Environmental Protection Committee in 2018, however there has been less progress in these fields post 2020 due to current and global recourse consumption.

Environment of Azerbaijan